Palinure was the nameship for the Palinure-class of 16-gun brigs of the French Navy, and was launched in 1804. In French service she captured  before  captured her in turn. After being taken into the Royal Navy as HMS Snap, she participated in two campaigns that qualified her crew for the Naval General Service Medal (NGSM). She was broken up in 1811.

French service
Palinure was commissioned on 20 May 1804 under capitaine de frégate Jance. On 1 February 1805 she sailed with dispatches to Martinique.

She then took part in Allemand's expedition of 1805.

On the morning of 22 April 1808 in Grande Bourg Bay at Marie Galante, Palinure and Pilade encountered Goree, under Commander Joseph Spear. In the resulting engagement Goree lost one man killed and four wounded; the French lost eight killed and 21 wounded. After about an hour Palinure and Pilade made off when they saw the schooner  coming to Goree's assistance, followed a little while later by the frigate  and the brig-sloop . Superieure exchanged some shots with the French brigs but the other two British vessels arrived too late actually to engage.

On 3 October 1808, Palinure captured the 18-gun  Carnation. Carnations capture was due in part to the cowardice of a large part of her crew after the loss of her captain and heavy casualties. The British later recovered and burnt Carnation during their invasion of Martinique.

Capture
On 31 October, Circe captured Palinure at Diamond Rock off Fort de France. Palinure, under the command of M. Fourniers, tried to take shelter under the guns of a battery on Pointe Solomon, but the battery was so high above the vessels that Circe did not fire at it as she came up. After a short engagement Palinure struck. She had lost seven men killed and eight wounded out of 79 men on board, most from the 83rd Regiment; Circe lost one man killed and one man wounded.

British service

Snap took part in the British capture of the French and Dutch West Indies, including the capture of Martinique in February 1809. In 1847 the Admiralty authorized the issue of the NGSM with the clasp "Martinique" to all remaining survivors of that campaign.

In August 1809, Commander Thomas Barclay took command of Snap, after having briefly commanded . In 1810 she was part of the force under Brigadier Harcourt that took the Dutch colony of Sint Maarten. There she provided cover for the troops landing at Little Cool Bay to encourage the Dutch governor to surrender his part of the island. Her participation in the campaigns would qualify her crew for the NGSM with the clasp "Guadaloupe".

Captain Frasier Douglas replaced Barclay, and was in turn replaced by Captain Robert Lisle Coulson.

Fate
Snap arrived in Portsmouth on 20 January 1811 and was paid off on 15 February. She was broken up in June at Sheerness.

Notes

Citations

References
 

 
  
 

Age of Sail corvettes of France
1804 ships
Brigs of the Royal Navy
Captured ships
Ships built in France